The South Sandwich Islands is a chain of uninhabited volcanic islands in the southern Atlantic Ocean. They are administered as part of the British Overseas Territory of South Georgia and South Sandwich Islands.

It is divided into four groups, from north to south: Traversay Islands, Candlemas Islands, Central Islands and Southern Thule. 

The archipelago is prone to violent earthquakes. Over the previous century, nine M 7+ earthquakes occurred, most recent being the M 8.1 in August 2021. None of these earthquakes are known to have caused fatalities due to their remote location.

History
The southern eight islands of the Sandwich Islands Group were discovered by James Cook in 1775; the northern three by Fabian Gottlieb von Bellingshausen in 1819.[clarification needed]

Departing from South Georgia, Captain Cook sailed to the southeast to discover Clerke Rocks and a group of islands which he named "Sandwich Land" in honour of Lord Sandwich, then First Lord of the Admiralty. The word "South" was later added to distinguish them from the "Sandwich Islands", now known as Hawai'i.

The Traversay Islands (Zavodovski, Leskov and Visokoi) discovered by the Imperial Russian Navy expedition of Bellingshausen and Lazarev in the ships Vostok and Mirny in 1819.

The United Kingdom formally annexed the South Sandwich Islands through the 1908 Letters Patent, grouping them with other British-held territory in Antarctica as the Falkland Islands Dependencies.

Argentina claimed the South Sandwich Islands in 1938, and challenged British sovereignty in the Islands on several occasions. From 25 January 1955 through summer of 1956 Argentina maintained the summer station Teniente Esquivel at Ferguson Bay on the southeastern coast of Thule Island. From 1976 to 1982, Argentina maintained a naval base named Corbeta Uruguay in the lee (southern East coast) of the same island. Although the British discovered the presence of the Argentine base in 1976, protested and tried to resolve the issue by diplomatic means, no effort was made to remove them by force until after the Falklands War. The base was eventually removed on 20 June 1982 and the installations demolished in December.

Since 1995 the South African Weather Bureau maintains two automatic weather stations on the islands of Zavodovski and Thule.

The territory of "South Georgia and the South Sandwich Islands" was formed in 1985; previously, both archipelagos had been governed as part of the Falkland Islands Dependencies.

On 10 February 2008 an earthquake of magnitude 6.5 on the Richter Scale had its epicentre 205 km south-southeast of Bristol Island. On 30 June 2008, an earthquake of magnitude 7.0 struck the region.

Geography
The northernmost of the South Sandwich Islands form the Traversay Islands and Candlemas Islands groups, while the southernmost make up Southern Thule. The three largest islandsSaunders, Montagu, and Bristollie between the two. The Islands' highest point is Mount Belinda on Montagu Island. The fourth highest peak, Mount Michael on Saunders Island has a persistent lava lake, known to occur at only eight volcanoes in the world.

Automatic weather stations are on Thule Island and Zavodovski. To the northwest of Zavodovski Island is the Protector Shoal, a submarine volcano.

The South Sandwich Islands from north to south are:

A series of six passages separates each of the islands or island groups in the chain. They are, from north to south: Zavodovski Isl., Traverse passage, Visokoi Isl., Brown's passage, Candlemas Isl., Shackleton's passage, Saunders Isl., Larsen's passage, Montagu Isl., Biscoe's passage, Bristol Isl., Forsters Passage, Southern Thule. Nelson Channel is the passage between Candlemas and Vindication Island.

See also
 List of Antarctic and subantarctic islands

References

 	

Antarctic region
Islands of the South Atlantic Ocean
Volcanic arc islands
Islands of South Georgia and the South Sandwich Islands